KSDK has won a multitude of awards including Regional Emmys, Gabriel Awards, and Regional Edward R. Murrow Awards; KSDK has also been recognized by the National Association of Black Journalists and the Associated Press.

2003
In 2003, KSDK was awarded the WeatheRate seal of approval, an award that certifies KSDK as the most accurate weather station in St. Louis.  The data used to determine a winner is refigured every 6 months by the non-profit WeatheRate organization.  Also in 2003, KSDK was awarded 14 Regional Emmy Awards:
News Feature-Entertainment/Humorous: (Steve Jankowski: "Arch Light")
News Feature-Political: (Randy Jackson: "Words of a Nation")
Sports Report: (Malcolm Briggs: "Emily Parsons")
Editorial/Commentary: (Mike Bush: "My Turn")
Religious: (Dan Gray: "Higher Calling")
Live Event Special: (Mike Bush & Frank Cusumano: "Ozzie Smith-Call to the Hall")
Promotion: News: ("People you Know")
Public Service Announcement: ("Warner's Warm-Up")
Weathercaster: (Cindy Preszler)
Photographer/Videographer: Pre-Produced News
Writing: Promo/PSA/Commercial: ("Now More Than Ever 2")
Art Direction/Design: News: ("Technicolor")
Animation: ("Velocity")
Audio: ("Cards Retro")

In 2003, KSDK was awarded one Regional Edward R. Murrow Award:
Overall Excellence

2004
In 2004, KSDK was awarded 20 Regional Emmy Awards:
Interactivity: (Leisa Zigman: "Cutting")
Community Outreach Program: ("A Place to Call Home")
Religious: (Chris Balish: "Cross By the Road")
Host/Reporter (Other Than News): (Heidi Glaus)
Art Direction/Design: News: ("Analgamation")
Editor: Pre-Produced News
Photographer/Videographer: Pre-Produced News
News Feature-Business/Consumer/Finance: (Wendy Erikson: "Clock Shop")
News Feature-Culture: (Randy Jackson: "Eyes of the Holocaust")
News Feature-Culture: (Randy Jackson: "Cover Story: Forgotten Heroes")
Sports Feature: (Frank Cusumano: "Oldest QB")
Sports Program: (Frank Cusumano: "SportsPlus")
Sports Special: (Rene Knott: "Winging It, Cardinals 2004")
Sports Special: (Malcolm Briggs: Max Questions-Rams 2003")
Writing: (Chris Balish)
Spot News: (Ann Rubin: "The Fugitive")
Spot News: (Ann Rubin: "We Had to get Them Out")
Weathercaster: (John Fuller (meteorologist)|John Fuller)
Weathercaster: (Mike Roberts)
Sportscaster: (Frank Cusumano)

In 2004, KSDK was awarded a Regional Edward R. Murrow Award:
Overall Excellence

2005
In 2005, Karen Foss was inducted into the Silver Circle for her 25 years of journalistic excellence. Also in 2005, KSDK was awarded 15 Regional Emmy Awards:
Special Reporting-Feature: (Randy Jackson: "The Enemy Among Us")
Special Reporting-Political: (Mike Bush: "Images of War")
General News Report: (Randy Jackson: "Covert Task Force")
Children's/Teen: ("Cardinals Crew")
Community Outreach Program: ("Tsunami Relief, St. Louis Responds")
Promotion-News: ("The Story Behind the Story")
Promotion-Programming: ("Greek Lessons")
Commercial Spot: ("Back to Bed")
Sportscaster: (Frank Cusumano)
Host/Reporter (Other Than News): (Chris Balish)
Photographer/Videographer-Pre-Produced News
Editor-Same Day News
Editor-Pre-Produced News
Graphics-News
Graphics-Promo/PSA/Commercial: ("Flashback 5")
Animation: ("Professor Pixel's Percolating Party")
Audio: ("Scott Suppelsa Audio Composite")

In 2005, KSDK was awarded three Regional Edward R. Murrow Awards:
Sports Reporting
Videography
Affiliated Website

2006
Jennifer Blome and Art Holliday were both inducted into the Silver Circle for their outstanding achievements in the television industry.

KSDK